David Reekie is an eminent English glass sculptor who uses drawing and glass casting to express his unique vision of the human condition. His art can be found in the Victoria and Albert Museum in London and the Carnegie Museum of Art in Pittsburgh, as well as in several other public collections in the United Kingdom.

A founding member of British Artists in Glass, now the Contemporary Glass Society, Reekie's work has featured in countless periodicals and in over 60 exhibits worldwide.

Background and education

Born in the London Borough of Hackney (1947), David Reekie discovered an early love of drawing that has remained central to his life and work for well over four decades. Distinguished by his talent with a pencil and an active perceptive faculty he was encouraged to attend art college. 

Reekie studied art at Stourbridge College of Art (1967–1970). Set in the heart of the UK's traditional glass making industry, Stourbridge College of Art was a natural place of innovation and discovery in the world of glass art. What is thought to be the only complete remaining glass cone of its kind, reaching 100 ft into the air and enclosing a furnace around which glass has been made for almost two centuries, the Red House Cone, dominates the landscape.

At Stourbridge, Reekie studied under the pioneering glass sculptor Harry Seager whose plate glass stacking pieces, were ahead of his time. He also drew inspiration from Professor Keith Cummings commonly known as the father of English cast glass. A pioneer of cire perdue, or the lost wax casting technique, Professor Cummings is an internationally recognised glass artist and author of a number of books on the subject. Reekie went on to study at Birmingham College of Art Education, eventually obtaining a fellowship in glass at Lincolnshire and Humberside Arts (1975–1980).

In 1976 Reekie was part of a group of glass artists who founded British Artist's in Glass, now the Contemporary Glass Society This organisation was partly instrumental in bringing Reekie's work international recognition.

In 1988, he was awarded a Winston Churchill Travel Fellowship to research glass in architecture in the US. His work is currently shown in America by Thomas R.Riley Galleries, Cleveland, Ohio. Reekie has lectured extensively on glass sculpture and his own casting technique, in the UK Europe, US and Australia.

Modus operandi

An innovator both artistically and technically in the field, Reekie's work more often than not, begins on the page with a sketch or a drawing. These drawings are surreal in character and similar in attitude to the humorist John Tenniel, who worked first for Punch magazine and later collaborated with Lewis Carroll in producing the illustrations for Alice in Wonderland.

Like Tenniel, Reekie is driven not so much by the inner nature or surface beauty of his medium, so much as by his observations of the foibles and failings of human and animal character. As Jennifer Hawkins Opie of the Victoria and Albert Museum puts is:

"Unlike many of his contemporaries, the intrinsic beauty of glass holds little fascination for Reekie; in his work the material must be pressed into the service of narrative and comment. His telling explorations of humankind's obsessions are unique in contemporary British glass and they tread a fine between comedy and tragedy"

This combination of pictorial satirist and skilled craftsman, places Reekie's work in the tradition of the London born painter, engraver and social critic, William Hogarth

The 18th-century Hogarth took a lively interest in London street life and the political questions of the day, which he expressed in his paintings and engravings. A Londoner himself, Reekie states that one of the sources of his inspiration is newspaper photographs. The penny dreadfuls of today perhaps providing a ready source of images and stories, revealing the often absurd nature of our relationships with one another and political life.

Reekie's drawings also share certain qualities with those of the French caricaturist Honoré Daumier. The chequered shirt in Reekie's Different People may well be an implicit reference to the influence of Daumier on his Art.

While these drawings are the means by which Reekie initially expresses his ideas, what makes them unique among his forerunners, is that they are given three-dimensional form in coloured, cast glass.

Method

An early enthusiast of cast glass, Reekie has developed his own distinct version of the lost wax casting method. The lost wax process can be traced back to the Romans and involves creating a wax model which is then encased in a casting material and steamed out.

The piece is modelled first in wax with the base being moulded out of clay. The modelling is a gradual process that takes about two weeks.

Reekie is not simply an artist, but a craftsman par excellence, and it is here the skills of his craft first come to the fore. When the artist is satisfied with the model, it is carefully encased in a plaster and flint mould. As soon as the mould is dry, the clay is gently removed and the wax model is steamed out. The mould is now ready to be filled with glass cullet.

Whilst the mould is still damp, Reekie paints the inside surfaces with vitreous enamel which gives the glass the kind of 'painterly quality' that characterises his drawings: a technique perfected over many years. In this way the colour is transferred to the three dimensional glass sculpture. A displacement test, using a bucket of water in the manner of Archimedes, is used to measure the quantity of glass needed. The mould is then filled with cullet and transferred to a kiln.

The kiln firing programme takes about ten days. During the first 24 hours of the firing programme, more glass is added as the cullet melts down. After 48 hours the glass will have melted and there is nothing to do but wait for the firing cycle to run its course. The cooling or annealing process, takes about a week. The mould can then be carefully removed, using wooden tools. When cold. the glass is ground and polished with diamond tools.

Themes

A central theme of Reekie's work is the threat that modern life poses to our individuality and to the natural world. Much of his work is Kafkaesque in its perception of the powerful, anonymous forces that try to shape us; and our ability (or lack of it) to either adapt to them or escape them.

His expression of this is often satirically humorous, see for example the Robot Series in the gallery below. Reekie states that this series was partly inspired by his childhood memories of watching Forbidden Planet and Robby the Robot in the 1950s. Before the appearance of Robby, robots in movies and plays tended to lack personality characteristics, being simple mechanical devices. The artist suggests that his pieces are created to question our own, often robotic or mindless behaviour. Indeed, human stupidity is a recurrent theme of Reekie's work.

Perhaps the fact that today we give robots human characteristics, is as much a reflection on our own mechanical and unimaginative responses to the conditions we find ourselves in, as it is to developing technologies. In some sense our adaptability may well be our undoing. The title of the Robot Series, can be understood as a humorous take on Isaac Asimov's Robot series – and the Three Laws of Robotics may well feature. Another work by the artist, expressing the same themes is 'The Engineers'.

Reekie's work is occasionally overtly political, in Rising Tension for instance, we are told that the piece "relates to terrorism or the Israeli-Palestinian conflict" and that it shows his own frustration about people's stubbornness and inability to get along. More often than not however, he is concerned with questions that relate to the human condition generally:
 "My work is influenced by our reaction and adaptation to the society that surrounds us. We live in a world that grows more complex and difficult to comprehend. It has tensions and temptations that pull us in different directions. This creates characters and situations that provide a constant source of material from which I take my ideas",

In A Captive Audience (a work commissioned by the Victoria and Albert Museum) the text accompanying the piece described it in the following terms:
A band of naked figures stands rooted to the spot, each the clone of his neighbour, each indistinguishable from his neighbour, all hemmed in by a barrier and trapped on a confining platform. Seven of the figures face forward, but the eighth, at the back and unseen by his companions, has turned his head. He looks outside the barrier, perhaps hoping for a world with fewer rules and restrictions."

In a series of sculptures entitled Living in Confined Spaces, Reekie explores his sense of the ever-increasing restrictions we place upon ourselves.

The food we eat, the way we think, our notions of physical and political space are all in some ways becoming more limited. ... At the same time, these pieces also illustrate how humans can rise above their limited and shrinking world and somehow manage to find ways of making their predicament more tolerable'.

Recent work

An Exchange of Information

Reekie's latest work can be found in a solo exhibition, hosted by Dan Klein Associates. The exhibition is entitled, An Exchange of Information.

In these pieces the artist uses an 'Everyman' figure in the form of an archetypal glass head and a series of small ceramic birds, to express his perception of our relationship with birds.

These small ceramic, mass-produced birds, are familiar artefacts in our cultural landscape. Frequently found at car boot sales, they haunt the shelves of charity shops and the mantelpieces of old ladies who treasure them. The juxtappositon of these small birds alongside slightly unnerving, disembodied, glass heads, reminds us of the work of the surrealist René Magritte, who often used everyday, familiar objects, placed in new contexts, to infuse the object with a new significance, while making us aware of its hidden ambiguities.

As the artist himself puts it, "through surreal uses of situation and perception. I have tried to illustrate aspects of human behaviour. Often I used ironic. sometimes macabre humour to make a point"

Birds have always had a certain place in our mythology and literature. In Ancient Egypt, the God Thoth has a bird's head (the head of an ibis). He is considered the 'heart and tongue' of Ra, and the means by which Ra's will is translated into speech. An Augur, or priest of Ancient Rome, was said to be able to interpret 'the will of the Gods' by reading the behaviour of birds. While Native Americans, renowned for their understanding of the natural world and their reverence for it, relied upon the eagle, to take their prayers to the Great Spirit. We need only remind ourselves of the recent devastation caused by avian influenza to gain an appreciation what is at stake in our relationship with these small garden birds. It is symptomatic of our relationship with the natural world itself. As Mark Cocker in his review of these pieces, writes:

It may seem absurd today. But perhaps we should reflect that in 1997 the Labour government offered a series of indices to measure the quality of life in this country. One of those yardsticks for the good life in Britain was bird populations. We are all now familiar how birds act as indicators for the quality of our environment. The owl, whose cry pierces the darkness, or the kestrel which wrestles the wind to a standstill at the motorway verge, will only survive if the trees, the insects, the other animals, the flowers and the countryside itself are all present and correct.

In An Exchange of Information the distinct nature of the materials used for the different parts of the sculpture, appears to underpin the distance between human beings and birds in modern life.

The ceramic birds used in these pieces are mass-produced and 'made in Taiwan, while the glass head is hand-crafted by the artist himself. The bird and the man survey one another, raising questions not simply about ourselves and the natural world, but about the relationship between Art itself and these Cultural artefacts. We live in close proximity with these small creatures, who find their way into our homes and shared spaces and yet the distance between us appears unbridgeable. The work speaks on many levels. These latest pieces suggest an affinity with the work of William Morris and his understanding of the part that methods of production play in the conditions in which we find ourselves.

Besides the evident surreal humour in these pieces, Reekie's work displays a sympathetic 'self mockery' and casts a sidelong, rather amused look back at itself. Like the artist himself, the pieces refer ironically to their own fragile existence in the modern world.

Gallery

Exhibitions
2008 'Myths and Legends', Contemporary Applied Arts, St Percy St, London.
2008 Palm Beach3, US Thomas R Riley Galleries. Exchange of Information, Dan Klein Associates Co[]etc. V&A Museum, London
2007 Palm Beach3, US Thomas R Riley Galleries. Verriales 2007. Galerie Internationale Du Verre, Biot, France
2006 Palm Beach3 Contemporary, US. Thomas R Riley Galleries
2005 Talking to Strangers, One man show at Thomas R Riley galleries, Cleveland, Ohio
2005 21st Century British Glass, Danial Katz Gallier/ Dan Klein associates, DUAL VISION, The Simona and Jerome Chazen Collection, Museum of Arts & Design, New York, SOFA New York, Thomas R Riley Galleries, The Art of Craft, Medici Gallery, London. Glass Collectors Weekend, Wheaton Village, New Jersey, Verriales 2005. Galerie Internationale du Verre, Biot, France
2004 Palm Beach Contemporary, US. Thomas R Riley Galleries. The Human Condition. The Figure in British Art 1950–2002 Birmingham Museum & Art Gallery. British Glass Biennale
2003 ArtForm, Palm Beach, US, Thomas R Riley Galleries. The 31st Annual International Glass Invitational, Habatat Galleries, Michigan, US
SOFA 2003, New York City, Thomas R Riley Galleries
Verriales 2003. Galerie Internationale Du Verre, Biot, France. Glass Collectors Weekend, Wheaton Village, New Jersey, US, Thomas R Riley Galleries.
SOFA 2003, Chicago, US, Thomas R Riley Galleries
2002 30th Annual International Glass Invitational, Habatat Galleries, Michigan US
2002 Palm Springs International Art Fair
2001 Cowdy Gallery, 31 Culver St, Newent, Gloucestershire
2001 Millennium Glass Commissions, Broadfield Glass Museum, West Midlands
2001 29th Annual International Invitational, Habatat Galleries, Michigan, US
2001 David Reekie: Sculptor in Glass, Humour, Politics and the Human Condition at the Rotunda Gallery, Norwich Castle, Norwich, Norfolk
2001 International Glass, Habatat Galleries, Millennium Museum, Beijing Shanghai Fine Arts Museum
2001 SOFA Chicago 2001, Navy Pier, Chicago, US
2001 4th Hsin-Chu International Glass Art Festival and Symposium, Hsin-Chu Municipal Glass Museum, Hsin-Chu, Taiwan.1999 SOFA 99, New York City
2000 SOFA 2000 New York City
1999 Verriales 99, Galerie Internationale Du Verre, Biot, France
1999 New Glass Economy, Shanghai Public Library, People's Republic of China
1999 SOFA 99, Chicago, US
1998 SOFA 98, New York City
1998 Jerwood Prize for Glass Exhibition, Crafts Council, London
1998 SOFA 98, Chicago, US 1995 English Glass Art, Galerie Rob Van Den Doel, The Hague, Netherlands
1997 Hsinchu International Glass, Taiwan. 1990 British Glass, Williamson Museum, Liverpool
1996 William Morris Revisited, Questioning the Legacy, Whitworth Art Gallery, Manchester
1996 Verriales 96, Galerie Internationale Du Verre, Biot, France
1996 Venezia Aperto Vetro, Ducal Palace, Venice
1995 SOFA 95, Chicago, US
1995 David Reekie, One Man Show, Miller Gallery, New York City
1995 Breaking Point, Alden Biesen, Belgium
1994 World Glass Now 94, Hokkaido Museum of Modern Art, Sapporo, Japan
1994 New Kilnformed Glass: Heller Gallery, Palm Beach, US 1984 Verre Contemporain en Europe, Galerie Paskine de Gignoux, Strasbourg, France
1993 The Glass Show, Crafts Council Gallery, London, England
1992 David Reekie, Galerie Suzel Berna, Antibes & Paris, France
1991 Cast Glass Invitational, Habatat Galleries, Boca Raton, Florida, US
1991 David Reekie, Miller Gallery, New York
1991 International Glass Show, Marco Museo del Arte Contemporanio, Monterrey, Mexico & Museo Rufino Tamayo, Mexico
1991 La Verre, International Exhibition of Glass, Rouen, France
1990 18th International Glass Invitational, Habatat Galleries, Michigan, US
1989 Form, Construction and Glass, Contact Gallery, Norwich
1989 Masterworks of Contemporary Glass, Christies, New York
1989 New Art Forms, Chicago International Art Exposition, US
1988 International Exhibition of Glass Craft 88, Kanazawa, Japan
1988 British Contemporary Glass, Braggiotti Gallery, Rotterdam
1987 Stourbridge Glass 1854–1987, Birmingham Museum and Art Gallery
1987 Studio Glass Gallery of Great Britain, Montclair, New Jersey, US
1985 Studio Glass, British Crafts Centre, London 1987 Glass Art, Museum of Art, São Paulo, Brazil
1984 New Glasswork from Britain, Essener Glasgalerie, Essen, Germany
1984 Studio Glass since 1945, Royal Pavilion Art Gallery & Museum, Brighton
1983 British Glass Artists, Glass Art Gallery, Toronto, Canada
1983 David Reekie & Jim Roddis, Het Glashuis, Alkmaar, Netherlands
1981 New Glass, Victoria & New Albert Museum, London
1979 Glass Now, Portsmouth Museum and Art Gallery
1979 British Artists in Glass, Galerie SM, Frankfurt, Germany
1978 Six Modern Glassmakers, Dudley Art Gallery
1977 Glass Constructions, Usher Gallery, Lincoln
1977 British Artists in Glass, British Crafts Centre, London
1973 Glass & Ceramics, Dudley Art Gallery
1971 New Dimensions 71, Camden Arts Centre, London
1970 Manufactured Art, Camden Arts Centre, London

Work in Museums
Manchester City Art Gallery
Small Cast Heads 1977

Portsmouth Museum & Art Gallery
Construction No. 3 1978

Broadfield House Glass Museum, Kingswinford, West Midlands
Construction with Guarding Figures 1978
Struggling Man 1984,
A Human Oddity 2001

Usher Art Gallery, Lincoln
Cast Glass Construction 1980

Pilkington Glass Museum, St Helens
Strange Offering II 1986
Man With a Wheel 1990

Glasmuseet Ebeltoft, Denmark
Strange Offering IV 1987

Norwich Castle Museum, Contemporary Glass Collection
Spring Return 1988

Liberty Museum, Philadelphia, US
Which Way? 1990

Carnegie Museum of Art, Pittsburgh, US
Greek Head III 1993

Victoria & Albert Museum, London Contemporary Glass Collection
Greek Head V 1994
A Captive Audience 2000

Birmingham City Art Gallery
Living in Confined Spaces II 1998

Musee-Atelier du Verre de Sars Poteries, France
Living in Confined Spaces III 1998

Tutsek Foundation, Munich, Germany
Someone Else's Body II

Shipley Art Gallery & Museum
Sitting on the Fence II 2003

External links
Artist's Website
Victoria and Albert Museum
Keith Cummings/ Keith Cummings
Contemporary Glass Society
Riley Galleries
Dan Klein Associates

References

British sculptors
British male sculptors
1947 births
Living people
British glass artists